Tracey Ullman Takes on New York is an HBO television special starring Tracey Ullman. The show was Ullman's first project for network; it led to the creation of the sketch comedy series Tracey Takes On...

Premise

The Johnsons
Visiting Wisconsin couple Penny and Gordon Johnson get separated in the Big Apple. After actress Linda Granger is hit by a bus, Penny takes over her role in Finian's Rainbow playing on Broadway.

Family Reunion
Fashion magazine editor, Janie Pillsworth is reunited with the parents she disowned thanks to a colleague who is vying for her job.

The Rosenthal Affair
Harry and Fern Rosenthal welcome their daughter's future in-laws to the city. Fern becomes jealous and suspicious of her future son-in-law's mother.

Cast
 Tracey Ullman as Penny Johnson, Janie Pillsworth, Jackie Pillsworth, Fern Rosenthal
 Paul Butler as Jay Levine
 Dan Castellaneta as Gordon Johnson, Bryan Lynn
 Nell Campbell 
 Maddie Corman as Sheila Rosenthal 
 Blythe Danner as Eleanor Levine
 Jill Eikenberry as Jessica Stern
 Joe Franklin as himself
 K. Todd Freeman as Byron
 Dan Futterman as Peter Levine
 Jim Fyfe as Drug Dealer
 Robert Joy as Disgruntled Ex-Employee
 Josh Mostel
 Todd Oldham as himself
 Parker Posey as Libby
 Jerry Stiller as Theatrical producer
 Michael Tucker as Harry Rosenthal
 Michael York as Central Park Acquaintance

Production
After ending her eponymous Fox show in 1990, Ullman chose to take a break from television and concentrate on motherhood, having given birth to her second child in 1991. That same year, her husband, independent British television producer, Allan McKeown placed a bid a television franchise in the South of England. Along with his bid he included a potential television programming lineup which included a Tracey Ullman special. When his bid was successful, Ullman created the ITV comedy special, Tracey Ullman: A Class Act, which lampooned the British class system. After its success, the American cable network HBO became interested in her doing a special for them. The one caveat was that the show focus on an "American" subject. Ullman chose New York. The special entitled Tracey Ullman Takes on New York was filmed on location in Manhattan over a period of three weeks. Three new characters were created for her to portray, along with Janie Pillsworth, and Janie's mother, Jacqueline; both characters were created and appeared in the previous British Class Act special. Weeks after the special's broadcast, HBO aired A Class Act on November 23, 1993, the special that initially sparked their interest. After the success of both specials, HBO became interested in Ullman doing a "takes on" series. Ullman and her husband agreed, and the pair set up production in Los Angeles in 1995 to begin work on Tracey Takes On....

Format
The special is split into three acts with one bit (Linda Granger being hit by a bus) shown from the point-of-view of two different characters: Penny Johnson and Fern Rosenthal (who causes the accident).

Reception

Critical response
The special received generally favorable reviews from critics. Tony Scott of Variety wrote, "Ullman lends depth and insight to all her characterizations ... Ullman and the first-class cast surrounding her, the superior writing and direction give TV comedy a much-needed lift."

Awards and nominations

Home media
The special acts as a bonus feature on the DVD set Tracey Takes On... Complete Season 1. It became available on Hulu in the United States in 2012.

References

Sources

External links
 

Tracey Ullman
HBO network specials
1993 television specials
1990s American television specials
1990s in comedy
Television series by Fremantle (company)